Donald McLean (October 6, 1926 – August 23, 2009) was a Canadian ice hockey player with the Lethbridge Maple Leafs.

Career 
McLean won a gold medal at the 1951 World Ice Hockey Championships in Paris, France. The 1951 Lethbridge Maple Leafs team was inducted to the Alberta Sports Hall of Fame in 1974.

References

1926 births
2009 deaths
Canadian ice hockey defencemen
Ice hockey people from Alberta
Sportspeople from Lethbridge